Danny Osborne is an artist born in Dorset, England in 1949. He is a resident of Iqaluit, Nunavut, Canada and Cork, Ireland. Osborne studied at Bournemouth & Poole College of Art. He is best known for his public sculptures, particularly his Oscar Wilde Memorial Sculpture in Merrion Square Park (originally commissioned by Guinness Ireland Group for £45,000), located across from Ireland's National Gallery; listed by The Irish Times as one of the sites to see before you die along with an essay by Paula Murphy in the book Wilde: The Irishman and other notable public work including "First Breath" at Millennium Park in Kilrush, Co. Clare. In 1986, while living on the Beara peninsula in West Cork, Osborne and his series of porcelain figures were the subject of the documentary "Birds in Porcelain" by David Shaw-Smith.

He is also known for his paintings of the Canadian Arctic and his experimentation with lava flows to create sculptures, which he is believed to be the first to figure out a process of casting sculpture out of live lava flows. His work has included lava cast sculptures from the active complex volcano Pacaya. His work is in both public and private collections including AIB, the Arts Council of Ireland, Bord Fáilte, the Investment Bank of Ireland, Bank of Ireland, the Contemporary Irish Art Society, and Art Bank's inclusion of the sculpture 'Conquistador Helmet 1'.

On 1 April 2009, former Speaker of the Legislative Assembly of Nunavut Peter Kilabuk unveiled his official portrait painted by Osborne. He is a member of the Iqaluit Visual Artists and has also taught jewellery students at Nunavut Arctic College.

See also
 Statues in Dublin

References

External links

Sculptor Danny Osborne on his Oscar Wilde Statue
Picture and details of Sculpture "First Breath"
Danny Osborne At Centre Space

English artists
Irish artists
20th-century Canadian painters
Canadian male painters
21st-century Canadian painters
Artists from Nunavut
Artists from Dorset
People from Iqaluit
Living people
1949 births
20th-century Canadian sculptors
21st-century Canadian sculptors
Canadian male sculptors
21st-century Canadian male artists
English emigrants to Canada
20th-century Canadian male artists